Conus paumotu is a species of sea snail, a marine gastropod mollusc in the family Conidae, the cone snails, cone shells or cones.

These snails are predatory and venomous. They are capable of "stinging" humans.

Description

Distribution
This marine species occurs off French Polynesia.

References

 Rabiller M. & Richard G. (2014). Conus (Gastropoda, Conidae) from offshore French Polynesia: Description of dredging from TARASOC expedition, with new records and new species. Xenophora Taxonomy. 5: 25-49. page(s): 35, pl. 4, figs 1-3, 5-6, 8-12]

External links
 World Register of Marine Species

paumotu
Gastropods described in 2014